Homer Adams Holt (March 1, 1898January 16, 1975) was a West Virginia lawyer and politician who served as that state's 20th governor from 1937 to 1941. Born in Lewisburg, West Virginia, he attended the Greenbrier Military School there and then went on to graduate from Washington and Lee University in 1918, where he was a member of the Phi Kappa Psi fraternity. After serving in the army during World War I, he returned to Washington and Lee in 1920 and studied law, receiving his degree in 1923. In 1924, he married Isabel Wood.

Holt taught law at Washington and Lee University School of Law for two years, and then practiced law in Fayetteville, West Virginia from 1925 to 1933. He was elected state attorney general in 1932, and served until becoming governor in 1937. Holt had been attorney general of West Virginia during the time of the Hawks Nest Tunnel tragedy and "During his term as attorney general, Holt successfully defended Union Carbide in the Supreme Court Trial, United States V. State of West Virginia, 295 U.S. 463 (1935)". Holt was governor during the time the Writers' Project of the Works Project Administration (WPA) began work on West Virginia: A Guide to the Mountain State in 1939. Holt did not want the guide to be published, he believed that it would discredit the state and was "propaganda from start to finish". After his term as governor he resumed his career as a lawyer by becoming general counsel for the Union Carbide Company in New York (same company behind the Hawks Nest Tunnel disaster).

Holt was a trustee of Washington and Lee University from 1940 to 1969, when he became a trustee emeritus.

Holt's grandfather Homer A. Holt (1831–1898) was a lawyer and justice of the West Virginia Supreme Court of Appeals; he died shortly before Holt's birth and Holt was presumably named in his honor.

References

West Virginia Archives and History - Homer A. Holt
6. Family Tree Confirming lineage of descendants

External links
Biography of Homer A. Holt
Inaugural Address of Homer A. Holt

1898 births
1975 deaths
Military personnel from West Virginia
United States Army personnel of World War I
American Presbyterians
Democratic Party governors of West Virginia
Greenbrier Military School alumni
People from Lewisburg, West Virginia
United States Army soldiers
Washington and Lee University alumni
West Virginia Attorneys General
West Virginia lawyers
Washington and Lee University School of Law faculty
People from Fayetteville, West Virginia
Washington and Lee University School of Law alumni
20th-century American lawyers
20th-century American politicians
Washington and Lee University trustees